Nereo López Meza (born Cartagena, 1 September 1920 - died New York City, 25 August 2015) was a Colombian documentary photographer. He is regarded as a pioneer of the genre in his native Colombia. He was a member of the "grupo de Barranquilla", a loose association of writers, artists and intellectuals that included Álvaro Cepeda Zamudio, Gabriel García Márquez, Alejandro Obregón, Rafael Escalona and Julio Mario Santo Domingo among others. He took more than 100,000 photos in a career spanning many decades. His work brought attention to the communities living in the valley and mountainous ranges of Colombia.

References

Colombian photographers
Documentary photographers
20th-century photographers
20th-century male artists
21st-century photographers
21st-century male artists
People from Cartagena, Colombia
1920 births
2015 deaths